Karima Berger is an Algerian writer. She was born in Ténès, Algeria. Since 1975, she has lived in France, where she studied for a doctorate in political science. She has written many books about her spiritual roots and the encounter between Arab and French cultures.

She was president of the Prix Écritures et Spiritualités (formerly the Prix des Écrivains croyants) founded in 1977.

Books
 Les Attentives. Un dialogue avec Etty Hillesum
 Éclats d'Islam. Chroniques d'un itinéraire spirituel
 L'Enfant des deux mondes
 Hégires
 Mektouba
 Toi, ma sœur étrangère
 Filiations dangereuses (winner of the Alain Fournier Prize)
 La Chair et le rôdeur
 Rouge Sang Vierge

References

Algerian writers
Year of birth missing (living people)
Living people
21st-century Algerian people